Trisetella is a genus of orchids, native to Central and South America. Twelve of the 23 currently known species are endemic to Ecuador. They bear small flowers with fused sepals and fused petals. The synsepal bears three hair-like tails, which is the namesake of Trisetella ("three little bristles").

Species accepted as of June 2014:

Trisetella abbreviata Luer - Ecuador
Trisetella andreettae Luer - Ecuador
Trisetella cordeliae Luer - Peru
Trisetella dalstroemii Luer - Ecuador
Trisetella didyma (Luer) Luer - Ecuador
Trisetella dressleri (Luer) Luer - Panama
Trisetella escobarii Luer - Colombia
Trisetella fissidens Luer & Hirtz - Ecuador
Trisetella gemmata (Rchb.f.) Luer - Colombia
Trisetella hirtzii Luer - Ecuador
Trisetella hoeijeri Luer & Hirtz - Ecuador
Trisetella klingeri Luer - Ecuador
Trisetella lasiochila Pupulin - Costa Rica
Trisetella nodulifera Luer & Hirtz  - Ecuador, Peru
Trisetella pantex (Luer) Luer - Ecuador
Trisetella regia Königer - Peru
Trisetella scobina Luer - Ecuador, Bolivia
Trisetella sororia Luer & Andreetta - Ecuador
Trisetella strumosa Luer & Andreetta - Ecuador
Trisetella tenuissima (C.Schweinf.) Luer - Colombia, Panama
Trisetella triaristella (Rchb.f.) Luer - Costa Rica, Panama, Colombia, Ecuador, Bolivia
Trisetella triglochin (Rchb.f.) Luer - Costa Rica, Panama, Colombia, Ecuador, Bolivia, Brazil, Venezuela, the Guianas 
Trisetella vittata (Luer) Luer - Ecuador

References

External links 

Pleurothallidinae genera